Toohoolhoolzote (born c. 1820s, died 1877) was a Nez Perce leader  who fought in the Nez Perce War, after first advocating peace, and died at the Battle of Bear Paw.

Representative leader
At a winter meeting in 1876, Toohoolhoolzote had been appointed the head speaker for the Nez Perce bands of Joseph, Looking Glass, White Bird and his own for the coming meeting with U.S. Army General Oliver O. Howard. The leaders allowed him to speak for them, and to deny or allow the military's demands.

Numbers by band
In the upcoming conflict his following of 50 people was fourth in size after Joseph's (about 300 people), White Bird (about 250 people), and Looking Glass (about 70 people). These Nez Perce bands totaled about 660 men, women and children. Of those fewer than 200 were men. About half that number were considered in prime warrior age. As the conflict progressed, more bands would join, with a maximum fighting strength of 250 or less. This includes about 25 Palus men under the chief Hahtalekin (also known as Taktsoukt Jlppilp - "Echo" or "Red Echo") and Husishusis Kute (Husis Husis Kute, Hush-hush-cute - "Bald Head", "Naked Head").

Native Americans' concerns
One of the major concerns of the leaders was that they have sufficient time to prepare to leave and to move their livestock. They wanted to wait until autumn as a minimum, or ideally, a year. Toohoolhoolzote also expressed the natives' reluctance to sell their land, which went against their religious beliefs.

Conflict
The military, on the other hand, demanded that they be moved in 30 days, or the soldiers would use force. General Oliver O. Howard put this to them strongly, after Toohoolhoolzote began to speak on the sacredness of the Earth to his people:

Toohoolhoolzote stood up to General Howard, and told him he would not obey. Yellow Wolf reported the final words:
 This arrest was one of the events which ultimately led to the war.

Simiakia
Toohoolhoolzote's use of the Nez Perce word simiakia is not clearly defined anywhere online. The following quotations illustrate some of its meaning. The quotes are from contemporary times, long after Toohoolhoolzote uttered the word.

Faith
As a follower of the Dreamer Faith, he tried to be a pacifist. The Dreamer religion called for throwing off white culture peacefully, by rejecting it and not participating in it. Yellow Wolf said of him:

Although he advocated for peace, when pushed he became a strong fighter, labeled "fighter from hell" by writers of the era.

Name
According to the Nez Perce dictionary, Toohoolhoolzote was a transliteration of tukulkulcúᐧt, which meant antelope.

References

External links
Page with a picture of Toohoolhoolzote, drawn by General Howard's son, who was there
Summary of the back and forth between Toohoolhoolzote and General Howard. Uses the words of the two men to summarize what happened.

1820s births
1877 deaths
Native American leaders
Native American people of the Indian Wars
Nez Perce people
Nez Perce War